The Venerable  Harold Lockley  (16 July 1916 – 26 September 2004) was an eminent Anglican priest in the second half of the 20th century.

Lockley was educated at Loughborough College and the University of London and served in the British Royal Navy during World War II. Ordained in 1947, he began his career as Chaplain of his old college. He was then Vicar of Glen Parva from 1951 to 1958 followed by five years as Canon Chancellor of Leicester Cathedral. The Vicar of All Saints, Leicester from 1963 to 1978, he was the sixth Archdeacon of Loughborough from 1963 to 1986.

Notes

1916 births
Alumni of Loughborough College
Alumni of the University of London
Royal Navy personnel of World War II
Archdeacons of Loughborough
2004 deaths